Batman 2 may refer to:

Batman Returns, the 1992 sequel to the 1989 film Batman
The Dark Knight, the second installment of The Dark Knight trilogy
Batman: Arkham City, the 2011 sequel to the 2009 video game Batman: Arkham Asylum
Lego Batman 2: DC Super Heroes
Azrael (comics), who took over the mantle of Batman during the Knightfall story arc in DC Comics' Batman
Terry McGinnis, the second Batman in the DCAU continuity 
Batman: The Enemy Within, the second of Telltale's Batman franchise